Twelve vessels of the French Navy have borne the name Auguste ("August", or Augustus):

Ships 
 , a six-gun fire ship.
 , a 56-gun ship of the line.
  (1708), a 56-gun ship of the line.
 , a 50-gun ship of the line.             
 , an 80-gun ship of the line.
 , a 24-gun corvette.
 Auguste was a 4-gun brigantine commissioned in the Mediterranean in 1793 or 1794 that the British Royal Navy captured at Calvi on 10 August 1794.
 , a brig.
 , a 6-gun brig.
 , a gunboat.
 , an 80-gun ship of the line.
 Auguste was a French gunboat of two guns and 37 men that  captured on 24 August 1814.

See also 
 
 
 
  (1939), an armed trawler.
  (1915), an armed trawler.
  (1915), a hired ship.
  (1915), a hired ship.

Notes, citations, and references

Notes

Citations

References 
 
 
 

French Navy ship names